Earophila is a genus of moths in the family Geometridae described by Carl Freiherr von Gumppenberg in 1887.

Species 

 Earophila alpestris Neuberger, 1904
 Earophila approximata Lempke, 1950
 Earophila atrox Schwingenschuss, 1924/25
 Earophila badiata
 Earophila badiata badiata (Denis & Schiffermüller, 1775)
 Earophila badiata fennokarelica (Kaisila, 1945)
 Earophila badiiplaga D. S. Fletcher, 1953
 Earophila chillanensis Butler, 1882
 Earophila costiconfluens Silbernagel, 1940
 Earophila crepusculata D. S. Fletcher, 1953
 Earophila defasciata Lempke, 1950
 Earophila eckfordii Smith, 1947
 Earophila impuncta Lempke, 1950
 Earophila niveifascia Hulst, 1902
 Earophila niveifasciata Hulst, 1900
 Earophila obscurata Lempke, 1950
 Earophila ocellaria Bodart, 1910
 Earophila oculisigna L. B. Prout, 1923
 Earophila pallida Lamb, 1909
 Earophila planicolor Lempke, 1950
 Earophila radiata Speyer & Speyer, 1843
 Earophila rectifasciaria Lamb, 1909
 Earophila rigidata Walker, 1863
 Earophila semna Prout, 1929
 Earophila senna Bang-Haas, 1930
 Earophila spilosaria Walker, 1863
 Earophila subbadiata Strand, 1903
 Earophila swettaria Wright, 1916
 Earophila switzeraria Wright, 1916
 Earophila vasiliata Guenée, 1858

References

 

Geometridae genera